Hugh Richard Hudson (12 December 1930 – 11 May 1993) was an Australian politician and 2nd Deputy Premier of South Australia in 1979. He was educated at North Sydney Boys High School Hudson represented the House of Assembly seats of Glenelg from 1965 to 1970 and Brighton from 1970 to 1979 for the South Australian Branch of the Australian Labor Party.  He held several ministries during his career, including being Minister of Education (1970–1975) during which time he was asked to deliver the 1976 Buntine Oration, which he titled "The Political Economy of Educational Advancement."

References

 

|-

|-

|-

Members of the South Australian House of Assembly
Australian Labor Party members of the Parliament of South Australia
1930 births
1993 deaths
20th-century Australian politicians
People educated at North Sydney Boys High School